The Titular Patriarchate of the West Indies is a Latin Rite titular patriarchate of the Roman Catholic Church. It is vacant since the death of its last holder in 1963.

Attempt to create a jurisdictional Patriarchate in the Spanish West Indies 
King Ferdinand V of Castile asked Pope Leo X to establish a patriarchate for the ecclesiastical government of the American territories discovered by the Spaniards. The Holy See was not keen to accept the establishment of such an autonomous Spanish American church and, on 11 May 1524, Clement VII agreed to create it but only as honorific, without jurisdiction and without clergy. In addition, the Patriarch was banned from actually residing in the Americas.
 
Antonio de Rojas, archbishop of Granada and bishop of Palencia, was the first patriarch. The following patriarchs were the bishop of Jaén Esteban Gabriel Merino (1530–1535) and the archbishop of Granada Fernando Niño de Guevara (not the homonymous cardinal) (1546–1552). After the Niño de Guevara's death, the office remained vacant because Philip II, against the Holy See policy, wished an actual jurisdictional Patriarchate. Finally, the king agreed in 1591 to propose the archbishop of Mexico City (but who was actually resident in Madrid as President of the Council of the Indies) Pedro Moya de Contreras. However, the new patriarch died before he could take the oath of his new office.
 
In 1602, Philip III abandoned the idea of a jurisdictional Patriarchate and used it as an honorific title for noble clergymen.

Merge with the Spanish Military Vicariate 
In 1705, Pope Clement XI named Patriarch Carlos de Borja Centellas the Military Vicar (General) of the Spanish Armies. Beginning in 1736, Pope Clement XII merged the office of Vicar General of the Spanish Armies with the Patriarchate of the West Indies pro tempore et ad septennium, that is, "temporarily for seven years", and added to those titles the  Royal Palace's Chaplaincy in 1741.
 
Clement XIII  decreed the merger of the Patriarchate and the Military Vicariate in 1762.

Last incumbent and current status 
In 1933, Patriarch Ramón Pérez Rodríguez was appointed Bishop of Cádiz and Ceuta. The previous year, the Republican Government had abolished the Military Vicariate. Thus, the Patriarchate remained vacant.
 
During the Civil War, the Nationalists organized a religious military service and the Holy See appointed Cardinal Isidro Gomá, Archbishop of Toledo, as interim Pontifical Delegate. In 1940, Gomá died and the auxiliary bishop Gregorio Modrego was commissioned with the deceased cardinal's military duties. In 1942, Modrego was appointed bishop of Barcelona. During all that time, the Patriarchate remained vacant.
 
In 1946, the Bishop of Madrid Leopoldo Eijo y Garay was appointed Patriarch of the West Indies, but without the Military Ordinariate, which was established once more as a military archbishopric in 1950, this time without any association with the patriarch's title.
 
Since Eijo's death, this titular patriarchate has remained vacant and is not considered likely to be filled.

List of Patriarchs of the West Indies

See also 
 Patriarch of the East Indies
 Grand Inquisitor
 List of Roman Catholic archdiocese
 Patriarchs

References

External links 
 GCatholic, with incumbents list linking to biographies

1524 establishments in North America
West Indies
West
Spanish colonization of the Americas